Beaver Island is a heavily forested and uninhabited island located on the Deerfield River in Rowe, Massachusetts.

References

Islands of Franklin County, Massachusetts
River islands of Massachusetts
Uninhabited islands of Massachusetts
Islands of Massachusetts